In telephony, a functional protocol is a type of protocol that is used to carry signaling messages between end points. Such a protocol is used to control the operation of devices at each end of the link. The adjective functional is used to describe protocols that are aware of the system state of the endpoints. Session Initiation Protocol (SIP) is a currently popular protocol for Voice over IP (VoIP) and other applications. 

Functional protocols, with their awareness of system state, are becoming more popular since they fit the current technology ethos by taking the intelligence of the network to the periphery. They rely on the capability of intelligent end points. This expectation   is compatible with the current technological and economic reality of silicon integration. Functional protocols are the hallmark of the dumb network architecture that marks the Internet.

Functional protocols allow the customization of applications to end user preferences. This should be contrasted with stimulus protocol such as MiNET which carry only event data and are not aware of system state. As a result, stimulus protocols were commonly used in traditional telephony architectures that relied on centralized call control. With centralization, stimulus protocols allow for more complex and reliable operation than functional because they offer standardized feature sets whose development costs can be amortized over a large number of users.

Telephony